Nayaki / Nayagi is a 2016 Telugu-Tamil bilingual comedy horror film, directed by Goverdhan Reddy. The film stars Trisha in the lead role, with Ganesh Venkatraman, Satyam Rajesh and Sushma Raj in supporting roles. The film is produced by Giridhar Mamidipally, who was the former manager of Trisha under Giridhar Production House, and has cinematography by Jagadeesh. Both versions of the film opened to negative reviews and became commercial failure at box office. The film was later dubbed into Hindi under the same name for television release on Zee Cinema on 16 April 2018.

Plot 
Nayaki is about the soul of a woman named Gayathri. Since the 1980s this soul has been killing people in a village. Entry into this village has been restricted by the Government of India since people keep on going missing when touring the village. Why Gayathri has been haunting this village for the last 35 years forms the rest of the plot.

The film starts with Gayathri wondering to become a heroine and killing someone. The film shifts to a cafe where Sanjay, a director is sent to meet his rich would-be-fiancée. Then he meets a girl who is not rich but it is revealed that she is fooled by him and he made her fall for him. He takes her to an old bungalow with wrong intentions and to shoot it. But Gayathri who appears only in camera scares them and reveals his intention to her and Gaythri possesses her. Sanjay meets Gayathri's father's soul and he starts narrating why Gayathri hates this type of men.

She wanted to become like Sridevi from childhood. One day when a director misbehaved with her, the camera man named Yogender helps her. He starts making her dreams true. She develops a liking towards him. But when her father learned of Yogender's character, Yogender brutally killed and raped Gayathri and her father. It turns out both Gayathri and her father had survived as ghosts and the Goddess Bhadrakali possesses Gayathri. She kills Yogender in the name of revenge and swears to kill any man who misbehaves with a woman.

The film shifts to present where now Sanjay the director feels sad and guilty. He hatches a plan to make her heroine. Gayathri enters another body and when another director does the same behaviour she slaps him. The film ends with the release of Gayathri's film and when asked for Sanjay about Gayathri in an interview, he replies that whenever there is wrongdoing she will return.

Cast 
 Trisha as Gayathri
 Ganesh Venkatraman as Yogender
 Satyam Rajesh as Sanjay
 Sushma Raj as Sandhya
 Jayaprakash as Gayathri's father
 Brahmanandam as Cameraman
 Kovai Sarala
 Manobala
 Siva Reddy as Subbayya
 Sendrayan as Murali Krishna
 Ashwanth Thilak
 Jeevi
 Poonam Kaur in a guest appearance
 Nara Rohit  in a guest appearance

Production
Nayaki in Telugu and Nayagi in Tamil was launched in AVM Studios on 20 August 2015 and the first look posters were revealed through the social medias. The film was shot simultaneously in both Tamil and Telugu languages. The film was shot extensively in Chennai. The first schedule was completed by the first week of September 2015.

Soundtrack 
Trisha, the lead actress of the film made her singing debut with the song "Bhayam".

References

External links
 

2010s Tamil-language films
2010s Telugu-language films
2016 films
Indian comedy horror films
Indian multilingual films
2016 comedy horror films
2016 multilingual films
Films scored by Raghu Kunche